KKWK (100.1 FM) is an American radio station broadcasting a classic rock music format. Licensed to Cameron, Missouri, United States, the station serves the rural areas north of the Kansas City metropolitan area as well as serves as a rimshot into the St. Joseph area.  The station is currently owned by Alpha Media and the broadcast license is held by Alpha Media Licensee LLC. The callsign was chosen in tribute to an older St. Louis station, KWK.

Station Studios are located near the prison complex on Cameron's north side. Its transmitter is located some distance North of Cameron along US 69. In rural Daviess County.

Programming
KKWK is a classic rock music formatted station with a focus on community information, including local and regional news, weather, farm, and sports information. Branded as "Classic Hits 100.1, Regional Radio QUICK", the station is an affiliate of the Fox News Radio Network as well as MissouriNet and the Brownfield agricultural news network.  The morning programming is hosted by Nathan Steudle. Included in the morning hours are newscasts, sportscasts, the Breakfast Club, and a tradio program called Trading Post. Program director Chris Ward also serves as news & sports director for the station. Afternoon host Nate Gonner also produces and hosts several sports features. Sports programming on KKWK includes high school sports, Kansas City Royals baseball, Northwest Missouri State University football.

Ownership
On March 1, 2007, it was announced that GoodRadio.TV LLC planned to buy The Shepherd Group of radio stations in Missouri.  The Shepherd Group operated 16 small-market radio stations in Missouri.  The deal was reportedly worth $30.6 million.

Dean Goodman formed the new company, GoodRadio.TV.  He is the former president and chief executive officer of the television broadcasting company ION Media Networks Inc.  Goodman stepped down from ION Media Networks in October 2006.

The Shepherd Group included KJEL-FM and KBNN in Lebanon; KJFF in Festus; KREI and KTJJ in Farmington; KRES and KWIX in Moberly; KIRK in Macon; KIIK, KOZQ-FM, KJPW and KFBD-FM in Waynesville; KAAN-FM and KAAN in Bethany; and KMRN and KKWK in Cameron.

In December 2013, GoodRadio.TV merged into Digity, LLC. Effective February 25, 2016, Digity and its 124 radio stations were acquired by Alpha Media for $264 million.

References

External links
KKWK website

KWK
KWK
Classic rock radio stations in the United States
Radio stations established in 1995
Alpha Media radio stations